The Diocese of Matabeleland is in Zimbabwe and is one of 15 dioceses of the Province of Central Africa, a province of the Anglican Communion. The current bishop is Cleophas Lunga.

List of Bishops

References

Anglicanism in Zimbabwe
Anglican bishops of Matabeleland
Matabeleland